Seine River First Nation, previously known as the Rivière la Seine Band, is an Ojibwe First Nation reserve located roughly  west of Thunder Bay, Ontario. As of November 2011, the First Nation had a total registered population of 725, of which 327 lived on their own reserve.

Governance 

The First Nation have an electoral system of government, consisting of a chief and seven councillors forming their council. Chief Carrie Lynn Boshkaykin and councillors Carrie Lynn Boshkaykin, Tammy Tania Boshkaykin, Ronald Jay Friday, Thomas Johnson, John Kabatay, Roger Brian Spencer and Shane Curtis Whitecrow are serving their two-year term that began on February 11, 2020.

The First Nation is a member of the Pwi-Di-Goo-Zing Ne-Yaa-Zhing Advisory Services, a regional Chiefs Council, which in turn is a member of the Grand Council of Treaty 3, a tribal political organization serving many of the First Nations in northwest Ontario and southeast Manitoba.

History
The original Mine Centre was a settlement associated with the gold rush around Shoal Lake with a population of 500.  However, many residents moved to the new Mine Centre established by the Canadian Northern Railway after the collapse of the gold rush from 1903 to 1904.

Seven Generations Education Institute (SGEI) is an Aboriginal-owned and controlled post-secondary institution co-founded by the ten bands in the Rainy Lake Tribal area in 1985. The ten bands are: Big Grassy, Big Island, Couchiching, Lac La Croix, Naicatchewenin, Nigigoonsiminikaaning, Ojibways of Onigaming, Rainy River, Seine River and Mitaanjigaming. Each of the ten bands appointed one member to a Board of Directors of Seven Generations Education Institute, which functions with the leadership of the Executive Director.

Reserve
The First Nation have reserved for itself three Indian reserve tracts: 
  Seine River 23A (Ashkibwaanikaaning in the Ojibwe language), which serves as their main reserve.
  Seine River 23B (Mitaawangwe-ziibiing in the Ojibwe language)
  Sturgeon Falls 23 (Name-gojijiing in the Ojibwe language)

References

External links
 INAC profile
 Official website
 Aboriginal Affairs and Northern Development Canada: First Nation Profiles

First Nations governments in Ontario
Communities in Rainy River District